"Believer" is a single by English drum and bass producer DJ Fresh and English record producer and DJ Adam F. The song was released as a digital download on 7 June 2015 through Ministry of Sound as the sixth single from Fresh's forthcoming fourth studio album. The song peaked to number 58 on the UK Singles Chart. The song was written by Adam Fenton, Dan Stein and Ray Keith.

Music video
A music video to accompany the release of "Believer" was first released onto YouTube on 30 April 2015 at a total length of three minutes and fifteen seconds.

Track listing

Chart performance

Weekly charts

Release history

References

2015 songs
2015 singles
DJ Fresh songs
Song recordings produced by DJ Fresh
Songs written by DJ Fresh